Academy Sports + Outdoors is an American sporting-goods store chain with corporate offices in the Katy Distribution Center in unincorporated western Harris County, Texas, United States, near Katy and west of Houston. For 74 years, it was a privately held company owned by the Gochman family, until its May 2011 acquisition by Kohlberg Kravis Roberts. In October 2020, it was listed on  NASDAQ.

History
Academy Sports + Outdoors came into existence in 1938, when Arthur Gochman and his business partner purchased Southern Sales, a San Antonio-based Army-Navy surplus chain comprising six stores that were by that year no longer making any profit. At the time, Gochman was a practicing attorney in San Antonio. He had not been formally educated as a businessman, but he had learned much about the surplus retail business from his father, Max Gochman, who had owned a surplus-goods outlet in San Antonio and in 1935, still owned and operated a small chain of stores in Austin.

1970s-1980s

Gochman bought out his partner in 1973 and changed the company's business name from Southern Sales to Academy Corp. The Academy name was borrowed from his father's stores. It came from a now-defunct San Antonio Catholic school named St. Henry's Academy. Max Gochman had opened his first store across the street from the school in the 1930s, selling pre-World War II surplus goods. Later, when he moved to Austin, he used the name for his four army-navy surplus stores. Because many University of Texas students and graduates lived in the Houston area and were familiar with the Austin stores, Max Gochman permitted his son to use the name, knowing that it would help his son's business. In 1978, the younger Gochman gave up his law practice and moved to Houston to assume active control of the company and complete the overhaul of its basic merchandising policies.

Academy built new offices and a 50,000-sq-ft warehouse in 1981. The chain grew from eight stores in 1980 to 12 in 1985.

By the end of the 1980s, Academy had become a popular Texas chain. Among other things, its outlets sold more state fishing licenses than its chief competitor, Oshman's Sporting Goods, or any other group of stores.

1990s

By 1990, Academy had grown to 18 stores. At that time, it was selling more cowboy boots than any other chain in the United States. It also began a period of more rapid expansion, jumping to 34 stores by 1995, the year after it first moved into two adjoining states. It opened its first store outside Texas in Edmond, Oklahoma, in June 1994, then added a store in Lafayette, Louisiana, the following November, thus ending the company's exclusive Texas identity.

Academy's roots remain in Texas, though, and the epicenter of the company's business always has been the greater Houston area. Almost half of its stores are located there, as are the company headquarters and its distribution facility. As it has expanded beyond its home base, Academy has sought "hot-market" locales, places that from market analysis offered the promise of high-volume sales. The result has been that it has never had to close one of its new stores, all of which have been profitable since their first day of operation.

David Gochman, the founder's son and Chinese-studies graduate from Harvard and University of Texas law-school graduate, joined Academy in 1995 on a full-time basis. By that time, his father, then 65, had built Academy into a $350 million retail chain and was ready to turn control of the business over to his 30-year-old son. David Gochman initially served as vice-president of store operations and general counsel, but in the following year he succeeded his father as Academy's chairman, president, and CEO.

In 1996, Academy expanded into Alabama. In 1998, it opened its first Florida location. In 1999, it expanded in Mississippi and Tennessee.

2000s

In 2000, Academy opened its 50th location in Temple, Texas, then expanded into Arkansas in 2003 and Missouri and Georgia in 2005. In 2006, the company opened its first 100,000-sq-ft store. Rodney Faldyn became president of Academy in 2007, and at that time, the company expanded into South Carolina. In 2009, Academy opened a second distribution warehouse in Twiggs County, Georgia.

2010s and acquisition by KKR

In 2011, Academy Sports + Outdoors was acquired by Kohlberg Kravis Roberts (KKR). Just months after acquisition, the brand launched an e-commerce store and became a multichannel retailer. At that time, Faldyn became CEO and president. In 2012, Academy expanded into North Carolina and Kansas. In 2014, it expanded into Indiana and Kentucky. In 2015, J.K. Symancyk became CEO and president. At that time, Academy opened its 200th store in Tupelo, Mississippi. In 2016, Academy expanded into Illinois and opened a third distribution warehouse in Cookeville, Tennessee. In 2018, the company opened its 250th store in Mansfield, Texas.

IPO, 2020s and further growth

On October 2020, Academy launched an initial public offering and became a public company listed on the Nasdaq with the ticker symbol ASO. After going public, a continued national expansion plan was laid out calling for 8-10 stores per year starting in 2022. Shares originally stood below $13, but eventually rose to $40 by June 2021. After its first public year, Academy debuted on the Fortune 500 list of 2021.
In 2022, Academy Sports + Outdoors opened its first locations in Virginia and West Virginia. The company has plans to open up to 100 locations in the next five years.

Sponsorships
Academy owns the naming rights to the Bassmaster Classic (officially referred to the Academy Sports + Outdoors Bassmaster Classic).

It is also the official sporting retailer of the NCAA Southeastern Conference and the Big 12 Conference. The Houston Astros, Kansas City Royals, and Houston Texans also hold strong partnerships with the store.

References

External links

 

American companies established in 1938
Sporting goods retailers of the United States
Companies based in Harris County, Texas
Economy of the Southeastern United States
Online retailers of the United States
Retail companies established in 1938
Surplus stores
Kohlberg Kravis Roberts companies
1938 establishments in Texas
Firearm commerce
Companies listed on the Nasdaq
2020 initial public offerings